Permocupedidae is a family of Protocoleopteran stem group beetles. They first appeared during the Early Permian, and were one of the dominant groups of beetles during the Middle Permian. They became rare in the Late Permian, with only one species known from the Triassic, Frankencupes ultimus from the Middle Triassic (Anisian) Röt Formation of Germany.  They are thought to have been xylophagous (wood eating), which is presumed to be the ancestral ecology of beetles.

Taxonomy 
Kirejtshuk (2020) included the following genera in an expanded (sensu lato) family, with the traditional (sensu stricto) Permocupedidae and related Taldycupedidae as subfamilies Permocupedinae and Taldycupedinae respectively. However, other studies have recovered Talycupedidae as more closely related to crown-group beetles than to Permocupedidae.

Afrocupes  South Africa: Western Cape (Kenmoore Farm), Whitehill Formation, Permian, Cisuralian, Sakmarian/Artinskian, −290.1–279.5 Ma. 
Afrocupes firmae  (Type species) 
Archicupes  (syn Palaeocupes ) Russia, Kemerovo Region (Kaltan), Permian, Cisuralian/Guadalupian, Kungurian/Roadian (Cisuralian/Biarmian, Kungurian/Kazanian), −272.5–268.0 Ma
Archicupes jacobsoni  (Type species)
Cytocupoides  Russia: Kemerovo Region (Kaltan), Permian, Cisuralian/Guadalupian, Kungurian/Roadian (Cisuralian/Biarmian, Kungurian/Kazanian), −272.5–268.0 Ma.
Cytocupoides longatus  (Type species) 
Cytocupes Russia: Kemerovo Region (Kaltan), Permian, Cisuralian/Guadalupian, Kungurian/Roadian (Cisuralian/Biarmian, Kungurian/Kazanian), −272.5–268.0 Ma.
Cytocupes angustus  (Type species) 
Eocupes Russia: Kemerovo Region (Kaltan), Permian, Cisuralian/Guadalupian, Kungurian/Roadian (Cisuralian/Biarmian, Kungurian/Kazanian), −272.5–268.0 Ma).
Eocupes cellulosus 
Eocupes lukjanovitshi  (Type species)
Frankencupes  Germany: Gambach am Main (Lower Franconia), Röt Formation Middle Triassic, Olenekian/Anisian, −247.2–242.0 Ma. 
Frankencupes ultimus  (Type species)
Ichthyocupes  Russia: Kemerovo Region (Kaltan), Permian, Cisuralian/Guadalupian, Kungurian/Roadian (Cisuralian/Biarmian, Kungurian/Kazanian), −272.5–268.0 Ma; Kemerovo Region (Tykhta River, Sokolova, Kutsnetsk Basin), Permian, Lopingian, Wuchiapingian/Changhsingian (Tatarian, Severodvinian/Vyatkian), −259.0–252.3 Ma.
Ichthyocupes kuznetskiensis 
Ichthyocupes skoki 
Ichthyocupes tyzhnovi  (Type species)
Kaltanocoleus . Russia: Kemerovo Region (Kaltan), Permian, Cisuralian/Guadalupian, Kungurian/Roadian (Cisuralian/Biarmian, Kungurian/Kazanian), −272.5–268.0 Ma.
Kaltanocoleus pospelovi  (Type species)
Kaltanicupes Russia: Kirov Region (Kityak), Permian, Cisuralian/Guadalupian, Kungurian/Roadian (Cisuralian/Biarmian, Kungurian/Kazanian), −272.5–268.0 Ma; Orenburg Region (Kargala), Permian, Guadalupian/Lopingian, Capitanian/Wuchiapingian (Tatarian, Sweverodvinian), −265.0–259.0 Ma; Kemerovo Region (Kaltan), Permian, Cisuralian/Guadalupian, Kungurian/Roadian (Cisuralian/Biarmian, Kungurian/Kazanian), −272.5–268.0 Ma. One undescribed species of this genus was recorded from Indian Barakar Formation of the Lower Permian.
Kaltanicupes acutus  
Kaltanicupes kargalensis 
Kaltanicupes kitjakensis 
Kaltanicupes richteri  (Type species) 
Kaltanicupes reichardti  
Linicupes  China: Anhui (Houdong, Yinping Mountain, SW Chaohu City), Permian, Guadalupian/Lopingian, Capitanian/Wuchiapingian (Tatarian, Severodvinian/Vyatkian), −265.0–259.0 Ma.
Linicupes yinpinensis  (Type species)
Maricoleus  Russia, Primorsky Krai (Cape, Novosilsky, Russky Island), Lower Permian, Cisuralian, Artinskian/Kungurian (Cisuralian/Biarmian, Kungurian/Kazanian), −279.5–272.5 Ma.
Maricoleus valentinae  (Type species) 
Permocupes  (syn Permocupoides ) Russia: Arkhangel’sk Region (Letopala River and Soyana), Permian, Cisuralian/Guadalupian, Kungurian/Roadian (Cisuralian/Biarmian, Kungurian/Kazanian), −272.5–268.0 Ma; Udmurtia (Chepanikha, Rossokha River Valley), Permian, Guadalupian, Wordian (Biarmian, Urzhumian), −268.0–265.0 Ma: Tatarstan (Mendeleevsk District, Tikhie Gory), Permian, Cisuralian/Guadalupian, Kungurian/Roadian (Cisuralian/Biarmian, Kungurian/Kazanian), −272.5–268.0 Ma.
Permocupes distinctus 
Permocupes latus 
Permocupes semenovi 
Permocupes sojanensis  
Pintolla .  Brazil: Rio Grande do Sul (Road Cut on Road BR 290 near Minas do Leao), Irati Formation, Permian, Cisuralian, Artinskian/Kungurian (Cisuralian/Biarmian, Kungurian/Kazanian), −279.5–272.5 Ma.
Pintolla ponomarenkoi  (Type species)
Protocupoides  (syn Tomiocupes , Tricupes ) Russia: Vologda Region (Isady locality, Mutovino), Permian, Lopingian, Wuchiapingian/Changhsingian (Tatarian, Severodvinskian/Vyatkian), −259.0–254.0 Ma; Udmurtia (Chepanikha, Rossokha River Valley), Permian, Guadalupian, Wordian (Biarmian, Urzhumian), −268.0–265.0 Ma; Kemerovo Region (Sokolova, Kutsnetsk Basin), Permian, Lopingian, Wuchiapingian/Changhsingian (Tatarian, Severodvinian/Vyatkian), −259.0–252.3 Ma; Kemerovo Region (Kaltan), Permian, Cisuralian/Guadalupian, Kungurian/Roadian (Cisuralian/Biarmian, Kungurian/Kazanian), −272.5–268.0 Ma.
Protocupoides acer 
Protocupoides carinatus 
Protocupoides elongatus 
Protocupoides esini 
Protocupoides plavilstshikovi 
Protocupoides sharovi 
“Permocupes” rohdendorfi  Brazil (Rio Grande do Sul (Road Cut on Road BR 290 near Minas do Leao), Irati Formation, Permian, Kungurian, −279.5–272.5 Ma) considered indeterminate to genus by Kirejtshuk (2020)
Tatarocupes   Russia: Orenburg Region (Novo-Aleksandrovka), Permian, Guadalupian/Lopingian, Capitanian/Wuchiapingian (Tatarian, Severodvinian), −265.0–259.0 Ma.
Tatarocupes granulatus   (Type species)
Uralocupes  Russia: Belebeevo Formation Kirov Region (Kityak), Permian, Cisuralian/Guadalupian, Kungurian/Roadian (Cisuralian/Biarmian, Kungurian/Kazanian), −272.5–268.0 Ma. 
Uralocupes major  (Type species)

References

Permocupedoidea
Permian insects
Permian China
Prehistoric animals of China
Beetle families
Prehistoric insect families